Cristiane Rozeira de Souza Silva (born 15 May 1985), known as Cristiane, is a Brazilian footballer who plays for Santos and the Brazilian women's national team. A prolific forward, she was part of Brazil's silver medal-winning teams at the 2004 and 2008 Olympic football tournaments. In total she has participated in five FIFA Women's World Cups and four Olympics.

At club level, Cristiane has played professionally in France, Germany, Sweden, the United States, Russia and South Korea, as well as in her native Brazil.

Career

Early beginnings
Cristiane started her career at the local football clubs São Bernardo (in São Bernardo do Campo) and Clube Atlético Juventus (in São Paulo). At the age of 15, she debuted for the Brazil Under-19 team and took part in both the 2002 U-19 Women's World Championship in Canada and the 2004 U-19 Women's World Championship in Thailand; Brazil finished fourth in both tournaments. In 2003, Cristiane scored one goal during one appearance as a substitute, when Brazil successfully defended their title at the Sudamericano Femenino. She was also part of the squad for the 2003 Women's World Cup, appearing as a substitute in all four of Brazil's matches.

Breakthrough
Cristiane had her international breakthrough at the Olympic football tournament in Athens 2004.  Brazil reached the final, which they lost to the United States, but still achieved their biggest international success until then, by winning the Olympic silver medal. With five goals, Cristiane was honored as the tournament's top scorer along with Germany's Birgit Prinz.

In February 2005, Cristiane transferred from Atlético Juventus to the German women's Bundesliga club 1. FFC Turbine Potsdam. During the 2005–06 season she won the Bundesliga title and the German cup competition with Potsdam, although she was often used as a substitute and had difficulties to adjust to the physical play in Germany. In the following season she was transferred to the league rival VfL Wolfsburg, where she scored seven goals during the 2006–07 season, but her problems to adapt to the style of play in Germany continued. In August 2007, Cristiane did not renew her contract in Wolfsburg and returned to Brazil to support the newly created Brazilian cup competition, the Copa do Brasil de Futebol Feminino.

Cristiane was the top scorer at the 2006 Sudamericano Femenino with 12 goals, even though Brazil competed with a weakened team and only finished second behind Argentina for the first time after four consecutive title defenses. In 2007, she scored eight goals at the Pan American Games, hosted by Brazil. In the final, the Brazilian national team defeated the United States Under-20 squad before a crowd of 68,000 at the Maracanã Stadium in Rio de Janeiro.

At the 2007 Women's World Cup Cristiane was voted the third-best player of the tournament. She scored five goals and she was the second best scorer of her team next to her strike partner, Marta. She was involved in a collision that resulted in a controversial red card for Shannon Boxx of the United States in the semifinal.  Brazil reached the Women's World Cup final for the first time which they lost to defending champions Germany. Cristiane came in third for the 2007 FIFA World Player of the Year award.

In February 2008, she signed a five-month contract until the Summer Olympics with the Swedish Damallsvenskan club Linköpings FC.

On 21 August 2008 in the Beijing Olympics, Cristiane was substituted in what looked like a repeat of the 2004 Olympics Women's Football final in that Brazil once again lost to the USA team in the final to end up with the silver. The match ended 1–0 after extra time. For the second straight Olympics, she scored 5 goals and was the tournament's leading scorer; unlike the 2004 tournament, Cristiane was the outright leading scorer.

On 28 August 2008, Cristiane joined Corinthians to play in Campeonato Paulista. On 30 August 2008, during her debut as a Corinthians player, she scored her first goal for the club, helping her team beat São José 3–1 in the Campeonato Paulista.

To the United States
On 24 September 2008, the Women's Professional Soccer (WPS) rights to Cristiane were acquired by the Chicago Red Stars at the inaugural International Draft. Cristiane completed her move to the Red Stars on 27 February 2009. On 12 July 2009, Cristiane scored the first hat-trick in WPS history, leading the Chicago Red Stars to a 3–1 victory against FC Gold Pride. She finished as the team top scorer with seven goals and was named to the league All-Star team.

She returned to Chicago for the 2010 season, but showed less impressive form and was made a free agent after only scoring three goals in 24 appearances. Chicago Red Stars suspended operations shortly afterwards and Cristiane decided to play the 2011 season in Brazil.

2009–present

Cristiane signed a three-month loan contract with Santos on 14 August 2009 to play in the Copa Libertadores. She helped her club win both competitions, and scored a goal in the Copa do Brasil final.

In September 2011, she joined Russian Champions League contestant WFC Rossiyanka. A year later she moved to São José Esporte Clube of São José dos Campos, Brazil. Early in 2013 it was announced that Cristiane would join the Icheon Daekyo WFC (Daekyo Kangaroos) in South Korea's WK-League. She quit South Korea shortly afterwards, in order to join Centro Olímpico in Brazil.

In August 2015 Cristiane and compatriot Érika made a double transfer to French UEFA Women's Champions League contenders Paris Saint-Germain Féminines. Paris coach Farid Benstiti already knew Cristiane, having been her boss at Rossiyanka.

In July 2017, Cristiane joined Changchun Zhuoyue on a transfer from Paris Saint-Germain Féminines.

In October 2017, Cristiane was one of five Brazil players to quit international football, disgruntled at pay and conditions, and the Brazilian Football Confederation's sacking of head coach Emily Lima. She soon relented and indicated a willingness to return to the national team in February 2018, ahead of the 2018 Copa América Femenina.

On 16 January 2020, after a one-year spell at São Paulo, Cristiane returned to Santos. On 10 December 2022, she renewed her contract until the end of 2024.

Personal life

Cristiane is openly lesbian, and has been in a relationship with Ana Paula Garcia Silva, a lawyer, since February 2019. On August 15, 2020, the two married in São Paulo, Brazil. Her son Bento was born on 26 April 2021.

Career statistics

International

Honours

Santos
 Copa Libertadores: 2009
 Copa do Brasil: 2009
 Copa Paulista: 2020

1. FFC Turbine Potsdam
 UEFA Women's Cup: 2004–05
 Bundesliga: 2005–06

São Paulo
 Campeonato Brasileiro de Futebol Feminino Série A2: 2019
Brazil
 FIFA Women's World Cup runner-up: 2007
 Pan American Games: 2007, 2015
 Summer Olympics Silver Medal: 2004, 2008
 Sudamericano Femenino: 2003
 Copa América Femenina: 2014 
Individual
 Copa América Femenina Top Scorer: 2014 (6 goals)
 FIFA World Player of the Year Third place award: 2007, 2008
 Third-best player at the FIFA Women's World Cup Bronze Ball : 2007
 Copa Libertadores Femenina Top Scorer: 2009, 2012
 Sudamericano Femenino Top Scorer: 2006
 Summer Olympics Top scorer: 2004, 2008
 FIFA Women's World Cup Goal of the Tournament: 2019
 IFFHS CONMEBOL Woman Team of the Decade 2011–2020
 Summer Olympics All-time Top Scorer: 14 goals
 Has scored 2 hat tricks in Olympic play, including the fastest in Olympic history. Cristiane, Birgit Prinz and Christine Sinclair are the only three women to have ever scored a hat trick in the Olympics.

See also

 List of FIFA Women's World Cup hat-tricks
 List of women's footballers with 100 or more caps

References

External links

 
 Video of an interview at FIFA headquarters in December 2007 
 Santos player profile 
 
 Linköpings player profile 
 
  (archive)
 Player French football stats  at statsfootofeminin.fr

1985 births
Living people
People from Osasco
Footballers from São Paulo (state)
Brazilian women's footballers
Brazil women's international footballers
Brazilian expatriate women's footballers
Women's association football forwards
Olympic footballers of Brazil
Olympic medalists in football
Olympic silver medalists for Brazil
Medalists at the 2008 Summer Olympics
Medalists at the 2004 Summer Olympics
Footballers at the 2004 Summer Olympics
Footballers at the 2008 Summer Olympics
Footballers at the 2012 Summer Olympics
Footballers at the 2016 Summer Olympics
Footballers at the 2007 Pan American Games
Footballers at the 2015 Pan American Games
2003 FIFA Women's World Cup players
2007 FIFA Women's World Cup players
2011 FIFA Women's World Cup players
2015 FIFA Women's World Cup players
2019 FIFA Women's World Cup players
FIFA Century Club
Expatriate women's footballers in Germany
Expatriate women's footballers in Sweden
Expatriate women's soccer players in the United States
Expatriate women's footballers in Russia
Expatriate women's footballers in South Korea
Expatriate women's footballers in France
Brazilian expatriate sportspeople in France
Damallsvenskan players
Women's Professional Soccer players
1. FFC Turbine Potsdam players
VfL Wolfsburg (women) players
Linköpings FC players
Sport Club Corinthians Paulista (women) players
Chicago Red Stars players
Santos FC (women) players
WFC Rossiyanka players
São José Esporte Clube (women) players
Associação Desportiva Centro Olímpico players
Paris Saint-Germain Féminine players
Division 1 Féminine players
Changchun Zhuoyue players
Brazilian expatriate sportspeople in Russia
Brazilian expatriate sportspeople in Sweden
Brazilian expatriate sportspeople in South Korea
Brazilian expatriate sportspeople in Germany
Brazilian expatriate sportspeople in the United States
Brazilian LGBT sportspeople
LGBT association football players
Lesbian sportswomen
WK League players
Pan American Games medalists in football
Pan American Games gold medalists for Brazil
Medalists at the 2007 Pan American Games
Medalists at the 2015 Pan American Games
Campeonato Brasileiro de Futebol Feminino Série A1 players
São Paulo FC (women) players
21st-century Brazilian LGBT people